Qazi Qadan (1493–1551), born in Bakhar Samma Dynasty (present day Sukkur, Sindh Pakistan) was the first Sindhi Sufi poet from Sindh in modern-day Pakistan. He is also called The Father of Sindhi Poetry. Qadan died in Mandia, Hejaz, Ottoman Empire (present day Saudi Arabia).

Reference

1493 births
1551 deaths